Guayadeque is a free and open-source audio player with database written in C++ using the wxWidgets toolkit. Guayadeque uses gstreamer.

Features 
A simple, intuitive user interface
Ogg Vorbis, FLAC and MP3 music playback support
Automatic album-cover fetching
Support for embedded ID3v2 album images
ReplayGain support
Support for multiple artist and performer tags per song
A system tray icon
Plugin support
Translations into many languages
 Player controls
 The Equalizer
 Now Playing playlist
 Player filters
 Library
 Radio
 Last.fm
 Lyrics
 Playlists
 Browser
 File browser
 Podcasts
 Jamendo
 Magnatune
 Portable media devices
 Track editor
 Cover downloader
 Label editor
 Save to playlist

See also 

 Software audio players (free and open-source)

References

External links

Audio player software for Linux
Free audio software
Free media players
Free software programmed in C++
Linux media players
Software that uses GStreamer
Software that uses wxWidgets